Piotr Hertel (19 May 1936 in Łódź, Lodzkie, Poland – 19 November 2010 Łódź, Lodzkie, Poland) was a Polish music composer and pianist. He wrote music mostly for teenagers' films as well as cartoons, including the Mis Uszatek.

References

External links
 Citwf.Com

 Spotkaniazpiosenka

1936 births
Polish composers
Musicians from Łódź
2010 deaths